Risteárd Cooper (born February 1969) is an Irish actor, comedian, singer and writer and is one third of comedy trio Après Match.

Cooper attended St Michael's College, Ballsbridge. He joined the National Youth Theatre aged 16. On leaving school Cooper gained a singing scholarship at the College of Music, Dublin and graduated from the acting program at the Samuel Beckett Centre, Trinity College. He lived in New York for several years, where he worked at the Ensemble Studio Theatre, the Irish Rep and Chicago's Steppenwolf Theatre Company (founded by, amongst others, John Malkovich) playing Mickey in the American premiere of Jez Butterworth's Olivier award-winning play, Mojo directed by Ian Rickson.

He has played lead roles in major theatres in Ireland, the UK and the USA including Observe the Sons of Ulster Marching Towards the Somme at the Abbey Theatre, Auntie and Me at the Gaiety Theatre, I Keano at the Olympia Theatre, and in numerous productions at the Gate Theatre such as Arcadia, An Ideal Husband, See You Next Tuesday, Eccentricities of a Nightingale, Betrayal (Pinter Festival) and The Deep Blue Sea.

He played the role of Dmitri in Brian Friel's play The Yalta Game, directed by Patrick Mason for the Gate Theatre at the 2009 Sydney and Edinburgh Festivals.He starred as Setanta de Paor in An Crisis, an Irish language satirical comedy series for TG4 for which he was nominated Best Comedy Actor at the 2010 Monte Carlo Awards.

In 2011, he wrote and starred in a series of parodies on YouTube sponsored by sports betting agency Betdaq.

Later that year he played Henry Higgins in the Abbey Theatre's first ever production of Shaw's Pygmalion going on in 2012 to star as Joxer Daly with Ciarán Hinds (Boyle) and Sinéad Cusack (Juno) in O'Casey's Juno and the Paycock at the Abbey Theatre, before transferring to the National Theatre of Great Britain.

In 2013 he played Finbar in a production of Conor McPherson's The Weir at The Donmar Warehouse, which transferred to the West End in 2014. It also starred Brian Cox, Dervla Kirwin, Ardal O'Hanlon and Peter McDonald and was directed by Josie Rourke.

In September 2014 he appeared as Sir Henry Coverly in the ITV drama The Suspicions of Mr Whicher "The Ties That Bind", while in 2015 he portrayed Dermot Nally in RTÉ's "Charlie" and Laurie Gaskell in the critically acclaimed comedy-drama "No Offence" for Channel 4.

Cooper has since appeared in such shows as “Delicious” with English comedienne Dawn French and “Quiz” directed by Stephen Frears.

He performs his own comedy sketch series for sports show “Off the Ball” on YouTube.

Appearances
The following is a list of appearances by Risteard Cooper.

  "Bird Sanctuary - Abbey Theatre debut (1995)
 Après Match RTÉ (1998 - present)
   "Cyrano" Gate Theatre debut (1998)
 The Closer You Get (2000) - Father Hubert Mallone
 This is Ireland by Arthur Mathews BBC 2 (2004)
 Chasing the Lions TV3 (2005)
 I, Keano (2005)
 Batman Begins (2005) - Captain Simonson
 Chasing The Blues  (2007)
 Bittersweet RTÉ 1 (2008)
 Chase the Lions RTÉ (2009)
 An Crisis (2010, TV Series, TG4) - Setanta de Paor
  "Pygmalion - Abbey (2011)
  "Juno & the Paycock - National Theatre (2012)
  "The Weir - West End (2013 & 2014)
 "The Suspicions of Mr Whicher" - ITV (2014)
   "Charlie" - RTÉ 1 (2015)
   "No Offence" Channel 4 (2015)
"Delicious" - Sky 1 (2017)  Played the part of James Harley
"Extraordinary" - Movie (2019)
Quiz - ITV (2020)

References

External links

1967 births
Living people
Alumni of Trinity College Dublin
Irish impressionists (entertainers)
Irish male comedians
Irish male stage actors
Irish male television actors
The Irish Times people
Irish parodists
People educated at St Michael's College, Dublin
Irish sketch comedians